Slavery in Georgia is known to have been practiced by European colonists. During the colonial era, the practice of slavery in Georgia soon became surpassed by industrial-scale plantation slavery.

The colony of the Province of Georgia under James Oglethorpe banned slavery in 1735, the only one of the thirteen colonies to have done so. However, it was legalized by royal decree in 1751, in part due to George Whitefield's support for the institution of slavery.

Pre-colonial period 
Native Americans did not commonly enslave members of their own and other tribes before Europeans arrived but this practice became common after European intrusion, continuing into the 1800s; slaves might or might not be adopted eventually, especially if enslaved as children; and the enslavement was rarely if ever hereditary. Native American slaves were most often captives from wars; captives bartered from other tribes, sometimes at great distances; or children sold by their parents during famines. However, there were differences between the types of captivity. European slavery was specifically focused on economic profitability, racism, and the concept of racial inferiority, something that had not been present in Native American societies prior to contact.

Colonial America (1526–1765) 

The life of a slave in Colonial America differed greatly depending on the colony, nature of work, the size of the enslaved workforce, temperament, and the power of the enslaver. Additionally there had been a variety of psychological experiences of those that experienced slavery from birth, versus those born free, and differences across the different ethnicities.

The first enslaved Africans in Georgia arrived in 1526 with Lucas Vázquez de Ayllón's establishment of San Miguel de Gualdape on the current Georgia coast, after failing to establish the colony on the Carolina coast. They rebeled and lived with indigenous people, destroying the colony in less than 2 months.

Two centuries later, Georgia was the last of the Thirteen Colonies to be established and the furthest south (Florida was not one of the Thirteen Colonies). Founded in the 1730s, Georgia's powerful backers did not object to slavery as an institution, but their business model was to rely on labor from Britain (primarily England's poor) and they were also concerned with security, given the closeness of then Spanish Florida, and Spain's regular offers to enemy-slaves to revolt or escape. Despite agitation for slavery, it was not until a defeat of the Spanish by Georgia colonials in the 1740s that arguments for opening the colony to slavery intensified. To staff the rice plantations and settlements, Georgia's proprietors relented in 1751, and African slavery grew quickly. After becoming a royal colony, in the 1760s Georgia began importing slaves directly from Africa.

Federalist Era (1788–1801)

Birthplace of the cotton gin (1793)
Georgia figures significantly in the history of American slavery because of Eli Whitney's invention of the cotton gin in 1793. The gin was first demonstrated to an audience on Revolutionary War hero General Nathanael Greene's plantation, near Savannah. The cotton gin's invention led to both the burgeoning of cotton as a cash crop and to the revitalization of the agricultural slave labor system in the southern states. The Southern economy soon became dependent upon cotton production and the sale of cotton to northern and English textile manufacturers.

Civil War Era (1850–1865) 
Georgia voted to secede from the Union and join the Confederate States of America on January 19, 1861. Years later, in 1865, during his March to the Sea, General William Tecumseh Sherman signed his Special Field Orders, No. 15, distributing some 400,000 acres (1,600 km²) of confiscated land along the Atlantic coast from Charleston, South Carolina, to the St. Johns River in Florida to the slaves freed by the Union Army. Most of the settlers and their descendants are today known as the Gullah.

Slavery was officially abolished by the Thirteenth Amendment, which took effect on December 18, 1865. Slavery had been theoretically abolished by President Abraham Lincoln's Emancipation Proclamation in 1863, which proclaimed that only slaves located in territories that were in rebellion from the United States were free. Since the U.S. government was not in effective control of many of these territories until later in the war, many of these slaves proclaimed to be free by the Emancipation Proclamation were still held in servitude until those areas came back under Union control.

Modern-day slavery 
In November 2021, the U.S. Attorney’s Office for the Southern District of Georgia announced an indictment of 24 people following Operation Blooming Onion and alleged a variety of crimes including forced labor, money laundering and mail fraud. The prosecutors described the defendants' actions as "modern-day slavery" and that they forced more than 100 people to work under threat of violence, confiscated their passports and documents, detained them in "work camps surrounded by electric fencing, or held in cramped living quarters, including dirty trailers with raw sewage leaks".

Commemoration 
In 2002, the City of Savannah unveiled a bronze statue on River Street, in commemoration of the Africans who were brought to this country as slaves through the city's port. River Street had been an active port for exporting the commodity cotton overseas, African American slaves carried cotton (as well as rice) from the warehouse areas to the boats, and African American slaves laid the cobble stones to create River Street.

In 2005, Wachovia Bank apologized to Georgia's African-American community for its predecessor (Georgia Railroad and Banking Company of Augusta's) role in the use of at least 182 slaves in the construction of the Georgia Railroad.

See also
Indian slave trade in the American Southeast
African Americans in Georgia (U.S. state)
Human trafficking in Georgia (U.S. state)
List of plantations in Georgia (U.S. state)

References

Further reading
 Jennison, Watson. Cultivating Race: The Expansion of Slavery in Georgia, 1750-1860. Lexington, KY: University Press of Kentucky, 2012.
 
 Wood, Betty. Slavery In Colonial Georgia, 1730-1775 (2007).

External links 

 "Slavery in Antebellum Georgia" from the New Georgia Encyclopedia
 Georgia's Slave Population in Legal Records, by David E. Paterson
 1861 Georgia slave map from Harper's Weekly; accessed on April 1, 2015.
 Sherman's Special Field Orders, No. 15, January 1865 Accessed on April 1, 2015.

 
African-American history of Georgia (U.S. state)
History of racism in Georgia (U.S. state)
Slavery in the British Empire
GA